Ministry of Investment may refer to:

Ministry of Investment (Indonesia)
Ministry of Investment  (Saudi Arabia)

See also